Hernán Ponce de León was a Spanish conquistador who participated in the discovery of Panama, Costa Rica, and Nicaragua in the early 16th century.

Notes

References

Calvo Poyato, José (September 1988). "Francisco Hernández de Córdoba y la conquista de Nicaragua." Cuadernos Hispanoamericanos. 459: 7–16, Madrid, Spain: Instituto de Cooperación Iberoamericana. 
Quirós Vargas, Claudia; and Margarita Bolaños Arquín (1989) "Una reinterpretación del origen de la dominación colonial española en Costa Rica: 1510–1569". Anuario de Estudios Centroamericanos. San José, Costa Rica: Universidad de Costa Rica. 15 (1): 29–48. .  

Spanish conquistadors
Spanish explorers
16th-century Spanish people